Aleksei Viktorovich Baranov (born 25 January 1980) is a former Russian professional football player.

Club career
He played two seasons in the Russian Football National League for FC MVD Rossii Moscow and FC Gazovik Orenburg.

Honours
 Russian Second Division Zone West best player: 2005.
 Russian Second Division Zone West top scorer: 2005 (24 goals), 2007 (16 goals), 2008 (18 goals).

References

External links
 

1980 births
Living people
Russian footballers
Association football forwards
FC Orenburg players
FC Tyumen players
FC Vityaz Podolsk players
FC MVD Rossii Moscow players